Inti levis is a species of insect in a monotypic genus in the family Eulophidae. It was discovered in Costa Rica and the Dominican Republic in 2010 by Christer Hansson.

References

Eulophidae